Disambiguation: for the character voiced by Kate Micucci see Motorcity#Protagonists.

Julie Kane (born July 20, 1952 in Boston) is a contemporary American poet, scholar, and editor and was the Louisiana Poet Laureate for the 2011–2013 term.

Although born in Massachusetts, Kane has lived in Louisiana for over three decades and writes about the region with the doubled consciousness of a non-native.  
Her work shows the influence of the Confessional poets; indeed, she was a student in Anne Sexton's graduate poetry seminar at Boston University at the time of Sexton's suicide.  
She is also associated with the New Formalist movement in contemporary poetry, although she has published free verse as well as formal verse.  Her formal poems tend to bend the "rules" of poetic forms and employ slant rhyme.

Life
Kane grew up in Massachusetts, upstate New York, and Montclair, New Jersey, where she graduated from Montclair High School in 1970. Her father, Edwin Julian Kane, was a radio and TV newscaster, and her mother, Nanette Spillane Kane, was a grade school teacher who published a handful of articles and short stories in journals like Redbook and The Christian Science Monitor. 
 
Kane graduated from Cornell University in 1974, where she studied with A. R. Ammons, William Matthews, and Robert Morgan.  She won the Mademoiselle Magazine College Poetry Competition, which was judged by Sexton and James Merrill, and went on to study with Sexton at Boston University, where she received her M.A. in Creative Writing.  From Boston, Kane moved to Exeter, New Hampshire, as the first woman named to the George Bennett Fellowship in Writing at Phillips Exeter Academy.

In 1976, Kane moved to Baton Rouge, Louisiana, where she began to incorporate her impressions of the unique landscape and culture of the area into her poetry.  Taking a job as a technical writer in New Orleans, she became associated with poets who frequented the weekly literary readings held at the Maple Leaf Bar—including Yusef Komunyakaa, Grace Bauer, and Everette Maddox. In 1982, British poet Geoffrey Godbert's Only Poetry Press published a two-woman collection of Kane's and Ruth Adatia's poems, titled Two Into One.  In 1987, Kane's first full-length poetry collection, Body and Soul, came out from Pirogue Publishing.  In 1991, Greville Press published her chapbook, The Bartender Poems, and she was introduced by Harold Pinter at the Southbank Centre in London.

Kane returned to graduate school at Louisiana State University in 1991.  While there, she won the Academy of American Poets Prize and wrote her dissertation on the villanelle under poet Dave Smith.  After earning her PhD, she took a position at Northwestern State University, where she is Professor of English and Creative Writing.  She has been a Fulbright Scholar to Vilnius Pedagogical University, and a two-time Writer-in-Residence at Tulane University in New Orleans.

Her work has appeared in The Formalist, The Southern Review, London Magazine, Feminist Studies, Modern Language Quarterly, Twentieth Century Literature, Literature/Film Quarterly, Journal of Consciousness Studies.

Two of her poems have been set to music by composer Libby Larsen and recorded on CDs by the American Boychoir and by mezzo-soprano Susanne Mentzer.

Awards
 Academy of American Poets Prize, judged by Louise Glück
 Lewis P. Simpson Award for her dissertation on the villanelle, directed by poet Dave Smith
 2002 National Poetry Series for Rhythm & Booze selected by Maxine Kumin
 2002 Fulbright Scholar at Vilnius Pedagogical University, Lithuania
 2009 Donald Justice Poetry Prize sponsored by the Iris N. Spencer Poetry Awards

Works

Poetry
 "Learning Curve (What They Taught Me)"; 'From "Sex Appeal of the Presidents"', poemeleon
 
  chapbook
  chapbook
 
 
 Alan Doll Rap, 2005

Editor

Memoir

Anthologies

References

External links
 "Author's website"
 "Julie Kane", thehypertexts
 

1952 births
Living people
Cornell University alumni
Boston University College of Arts and Sciences alumni
Louisiana State University alumni
Tulane University faculty
Northwestern State University faculty
Poets Laureate of Louisiana
American women poets
Chapbook writers
Montclair High School (New Jersey) alumni
People from Montclair, New Jersey
American women academics
21st-century American women